Satoshi Mori may refer to:

, Japanese basketball player
Satoshi Mori (skier) (born 1971), Japanese Nordic combined skier